Bonnie Piesse (born 10 August 1983) is an Australian actress and singer. Her breakthrough role was playing a trapeze artist in the Australian children's television series High Flyers at the age of 15 and not long after that she was scouted by George Lucas to play a young Beru Lars in Star Wars: Episode II – Attack of the Clones and Episode III – Revenge of the Sith, a role she reprised in the 2022 Disney+ series Obi-Wan Kenobi (2022). She also had recurring roles on Blue Heelers, Horace and Tina, Stingers, and Last Man Standing.

Early life 
Piesse attended a Rudolf Steiner School in Australia where she developed a love for the performing arts and honed her skills as a singer/songwriter. Between 2000 and 2002, Bonnie won the 'Ranges Songsmith Award' and 'Apollo Bay Young Performers Competition' for songs she'd written and she was one of only a handful of VCE performing arts students from around Victoria to be selected to perform at Hamer Hall as part of the 2002 'Season of Excellence'.

Career

Actress 
Piesse was cast as Donna in High Flyers when she was 15. She learned the trapeze and Spanish web for the role and took six months off school for the shoot. She then went on to play Alicia in Horace and Tina, had a recurring role in Stingers, and guest starred in Blue Heelers and Last Man Standing. She subsequently appeared in Star Wars: Episode II – Attack of the Clones and Episode III – Revenge of the Sith as Beru Lars (Luke Skywalker's aunt).

In 2005, Piesse played Sharona in Attack of the Sabretooth, which was directed by George T. Miller and shot in Fiji.

In January 2011, Piesse completed shooting her scenes for the romantic comedy, Love Eterne. She plays Sidonia, a psychic, mentor and confidant to the female lead, Medina, played by Melissa Navia. Her song, "There for Me" is featured in it. After completing its film festival run, Love Eterne  has won awards at the Los Angeles Movie Awards, Best Shorts Competition and The Accolade Competition. It was an official selection at the New York International Independent Film & Video Festival (20 November 2011) and NewFilmmakers New York Annual Christmas Show (13 December 2011).

In December 2017, The Actors Awards nominated Piesse for Best Supporting Actress for her role in Love Eterne Mourning, a short film made from a couple of her scenes from Love Eterne.

On March 29, 2021, it was announced that Piesse would return to her role as Beru Lars in the Disney+ series Obi-Wan Kenobi.

Singer and songwriter 

Piesse met Grammy-winning music producer Val Garay when she first arrived in Los Angeles. He introduced her to several songwriters including Jack Tempchin, Eric Kaz, Bonnie Hayes, and J.D. Souther, with whom she co-wrote some of the songs for her debut album The Deep End.  The album was recorded in Los Angeles, and was released in January 2011 on Big Deal Records.

Piesse's song "All I Have" was featured in two episodes of the CW television series Life Unexpected in 2010.

Bonnie recorded "Bittersweet EP" with Producer Emile Kelman and her song "Ariella" won the Singer Songwriter Category of the UK Songwriting Contest in 2013, alongside Lisa Nelson for her song, "Butterfly."

Another one of her songs, "There for Me", is featured in the romantic comedy, Love Eterne.

Piesse recorded a cover of Dream State (Brighter Night) by Son Lux for opening credits of The Vow.

Personal life 
Piesse is married to South African filmmaker Mark Vicente. Piesse and her husband were members of the self-described American multi-level marketing company and cult NXIVM. The couple left the organization in 2017 and became NXIVM's most outspoken detractors. Their departure from the cult is documented in The Vow, a documentary series for HBO directed by Jehane Noujaim and Karim Amer.

Selected filmography

Film

Television

References

External links

 
 
 Interview by Daniel Lehman at Backstage

1983 births
Living people
Actresses from Melbourne
Australian film actresses
Australian television actresses
NXIVM people
21st-century Australian singers
21st-century Australian women singers